Kau Lung Hang is a village in Tai Po District, Hong Kong.

Administration
Kau Lung Hang is a recognized village under the New Territories Small House Policy. It is one of the villages represented within the Tai Po Rural Committee. For electoral purposes, Kau Lung Hang is part of the Hong Lok Yuen constituency, which was formerly represented by Zero Yiu Yeuk-sang until May 2021.

Education
Kau Lung Hang is in Primary One Admission (POA) School Net 84. Within the school net are multiple aided schools (operated independently but funded with government money) and Tai Po Government Primary School (大埔官立小學).

References

External links

 Delineation of area of existing village Kau Lung Hang (Tai Po) for election of resident representative (2019 to 2022)

Villages in Tai Po District, Hong Kong